Sagda pila is a species of air-breathing land snail, a terrestrial pulmonate gastropod mollusk in the family Sagdidae.

Distribution 
This species occurs in Jamaica.

References 

Sagdidae